Expeditie Robinson is a popular reality television program in the Netherlands and Flanders (Belgium) that debuted in 2000 and based on a format first shown by Swedish television in 1997. The format, most notable under the title Survivor, has since then also been produced in many other countries. The name of the show alludes to Robinson Crusoe, a story featuring people marooned by shipwreck.

The fifteenth season in 2013 was the first season without contestants from Belgium, due to lack of television ratings in Belgium. However, the Flemish host Evi Hanssen would continue to co-host the show with Dutch host Dennis Weening. In 2014 Evi was replaced by Nicolette Kluijver.

Format
In most seasons, sixteen contestants are put into a survival situation and compete in a variety of physical challenges. Early in each season, two teams compete, but later the teams are merged and the competitions become individual ("samensmelting").  At the end of each show, one contestant is eliminated by the other teams in a secret "Island Council" ballot.

Seasons

Notes

References

External links
 Official website of Expeditie Robinson
 Official website of Expeditie Robinson at 2BE
 Blog of Expeditie Robinson (Dutch)
 

Dutch reality television series
Belgian reality television series
Survivor (franchise)
2000 Dutch television series debuts
Play4 (TV channel) original programming
RTL 5 original programming

es:Supervivientes
fr:Les Aventuriers de Koh-Lanta
is:Survivor (sjónvarpsþáttur)
pl:Wyprawa Robinson
pt:Survivor
fi:Selviytyjät
sv:Expedition Robinson